Tore Holthe (4 February 1914 – 12 June 1973) was a Norwegian military officer with the rank of rear admiral.

He was born in Trondheim. He was promoted to rear admiral in 1962, and headed the Royal Norwegian Navy's section  from 1967. He was decorated with the St. Olav's Medal With Oak Branch, and Commander, First Class of the Swedish Order of the Sword, Knight of the Danish Order of the Dannebrog, and Knight of the Icelandic Order of the Falcon. He died in 1973 and was buried in Horten.

References

1914 births
1973 deaths
People from Trondheim
Royal Norwegian Navy personnel of World War II
Royal Norwegian Navy admirals
Commanders First Class of the Order of the Sword
Knights of the Order of the Dannebrog
Knights of the Order of the Falcon